Tom Sammurtok is a Canadian politician, who was elected to the Legislative Assembly of Nunavut in the 2013 election. He represented the electoral district of Rankin Inlet North-Chesterfield Inlet until 2017, when he was defeated by Cathy Towtongie.

He is the uncle of Alexander Sammurtok, who was elected as the MLA for the neighbouring electoral district of Rankin Inlet South in a 2014 byelection.

References

Living people
Members of the Executive Council of Nunavut
Members of the Legislative Assembly of Nunavut
Inuit from the Northwest Territories
Inuit politicians
People from Rankin Inlet
21st-century Canadian politicians
Inuit from Nunavut
Year of birth missing (living people)